Johann Andreas Silbermann, also known as Jean-André Silbermann (26 June 1712, in Strasbourg – 11 February 1783, in Strasbourg) was an 18th-century organ-builder, as were his father Andreas Silbermann and his paternal uncle Gottfried Silbermann.

Mozart met with Silbermann during his (Mozart's) stay in Strasbourg in 1778, and played on the pipe organs in the two Lutheran churches Saint-Thomas (preserved), and Temple Neuf (destroyed in 1870), which he calls ″Silbermann's best".

Pipe organs by J. A. Silbermann in their original instrumental state can be found in the following churches, among others:
St Georges, Châtenois
Jesuit Church, Molsheim
St Maurice, Soultz-Haut-Rhin
St Maurice, Soultz-les Bains
St Thomas, Strasbourg

References

1712 births
1783 deaths
German pipe organ builders
Businesspeople from Strasbourg